Iskandar Tedjasukmana (Cianjur, 22 July 1915 – 1981) is a former Minister of Labor from 1951 to 1953. He was a teacher and judge.

Early life and education
Iskandar Tedjasukmana was born in Cianjur 22 July 1915. He finished his elementary education at HIS Cianjur. He continued his high school in Jakarta at MULO and AMS B and graduated in 1936. Afterwars, Tedjasukmana enrolled in the law school,  from 1936 to 1937.

Career 
He began his career by becoming a teacher at an Islamic school, Normal Islam School in Padang from 1937 to 1938. During the Japanese Occupation era, he worked at the Ministry of Law in Bukittinggi from 1942 to 1945.

After the Proclamation of Indonesian Independence, he worked in various positions. From 1945 to 1946, he became the Associates Chief Justice of the district court and a member of the Indonesian National Committee Bukittinggi. Afterward, he was appointed as the vice mayor of Buktittinggi from 1947 to 1950. As a vice mayor, he held two positions: member of the West Sumatra Executive Agency and Central Indonesian National Committee. In 1949, he joined a group that opposed the merging of  Labour Party of Indonesia to Communist Party of Indonesia. This group founded Labour Party.

As the United States of Indonesia was founded, he became a temporary People's Representative Council member from 1950 to 1951.

Minister of Labor 
Iskandar Tedjakusuma was appointed as a labor minister from 1951 to 1953 under two different prime ministers. During his two years tenure, he issued a controversial policy Emergency Act no. 15/1951 that banned labor strikes and founded Women Labor Social Committee in 1951. During his two years tenure, he issued a controversial policy Emergency Act no. 15/1951 that banned labor strikes and founded Women Labor Social Committee in 1951. He also served as the chairman of the Labour Party's political bureau from 1951 to 1956.

Post-ministership 
He was the candidate for People's Representative Council from Labour Party on 1955 Indonesian Constitutional Assembly election. In 1958, he authored a book titled "The Political Character of the Indonesian Trade Union Movement." He finished his dissertation at Cornell University in 1961 with the title of "The Development of Labor Policy and Legislation in the Republic."

Personal life 
Tedjakusuma married to a Minangnese women. He died in 1981. His grandson, is a Head Of Corporate Communications Google Indonesia (2016–present).

References 

1915 births
1981 deaths
People from Cianjur Regency
Industry ministers of Indonesia
Rechtshogeschool te Batavia alumni
Cornell University alumni